Thunder Afloat is a 1939 World War I naval film starring Wallace Beery and Chester Morris.  The movie was directed by George B. Seitz.

The submarine sequences were shot with the cooperation of the U. S. Navy at Annapolis, Maryland and around the Coronado Islands off San Diego, California.

Plot
In a New England port town, Pop Thorson (Wallace Beery) and Rocky Blake (Chester Morris) are rival tugboat owners. Thorson's boat has sunk in the shallow water while docked, and he is certain Blake sabotaged it to keep Thorson from winning a lucrative contract to move barges of military supplies. Thorson is a widower who built his own tugboat and lives on it with his adult daughter Susan (Virginia Grey). She loves her father, but also likes Blake (who denies the sabotage) and does not want the two men to fight.

As the United States has now entered World War I, the Navy is recruiting men for anti-submarine warfare. Susan and Pop Thorson trick Blake into enlisting by pretending Thorson is going to enlist himself. Thorson then gets the contract, but when his boat is afloat again and towing a barge, it encounters a German submarine. The Germans order the crew into the lifeboats and sink the tug and the barge.

When Thorson reaches port, he enlists at once. Due to his experience and the war emergency, he is immediately made an ensign and given command of one of the small new fleet of sub chasers based there. Thorson does not take well to naval discipline, particularly when his superior officer, in charge of the fleet, turns out to be Blake, who is now a lieutenant and dedicated to his duty. Blake respects Thorson's experience and tries to teach him how to behave, but there is little time and the message does not sink in well.

On their first mission, Thorson correctly reasons that any submarine would avoid the storm-wracked area where they were ordered to patrol, and would be in the lee of Nantucket Island. He violates orders, taking his ship there alone, and does find a German submarine; the same one. Sinking the sub would make the violation forgivable. But the German captain tricks the inexperienced Thorson into breaking off his attack by releasing oil from his vessel, and sinks a lightship before leaving. A cable then breaks on Thorson's vessel and tangles in the propeller. Thorson goes into the water to free it, but suffers a head injury. Blake then arrives on the scene and rescues him personally.

When Thorson recovers, he is court-martialed for insubordination, demoted to ordinary seaman, and put on shore duty.  Desolate, he finally decides to desert and go to Canada with Susan; but Blake stops him just in time and gives him a new assignment. He will now join the crew of a decoy ship: looking like an ordinary fishing schooner, its crew pretending to be civilians, it will actually have a concealed radio to summon the sub chasers as needed.

Joining up with a fishing fleet, the decoy is indeed attacked — by the same submarine again.  The Germans board and discover the radio, but Blake's fleet is already on the way. The boarding party returns to the submarine. With his captain's agreement, Thorson orders the decoy ship to try to ram the submarine. The Germans sink it and take Thorson on board as a prisoner and hostage, then dive to the seabed. As they wait silently, he seizes an opportunity to shut himself in a room and bang on the hull with a wrench, telling the listening sub chasers where to find the sub.

Blake realizes he must attack despite the risk to Thorson. But although the submarine is damaged it is still able to surface, and Thorson as well as its crew are taken off.

The film ends with Thorson receiving the Medal of Honor, restored to the rank of ensign, and again commanding a sub chaser, to the delight of Susan and the residents of the port.

Cast
 Wallace Beery as Pop Thorson
 Chester Morris as Rocky Blake
 Virginia Grey as Susan Thorson
 Douglass Dumbrille as District Commander
 Carl Esmond as U-boat Captain
 Clem Bevans as Cap Finch
 John Qualen as Milo
 Regis Toomey as Ives
 Leon Ames as Recruiting Officer

References

External links
 
 
 

1939 romantic drama films
1939 films
Films directed by George B. Seitz
World War I naval films
World War I submarine films
War romance films
American war drama films
Metro-Goldwyn-Mayer films
American romantic drama films
American black-and-white films
Films scored by Edward Ward (composer)
1930s English-language films
1930s American films